"Amare" is a song recorded by Swedish rapper Adrijana. The song was released as a digital download in Sweden on 26 February 2017 and peaked at number 52 on the Swedish Singles Chart. It took part in Melodifestivalen 2017, and placed sixth in the first semi-final on 4 February 2017 and was written by Adrijana and Martin Tjärnberg.

Track listing

Chart performance

Weekly charts

Release history

References

2017 singles
2016 songs
Swedish-language songs
Melodifestivalen songs of 2017
Adrijana Krasniqi songs
Universal Music Group singles